Adrian George Zmed (born March 14, 1954) is an American actor, singer and television personality, noted for the roles of Johnny Nogerelli in Grease 2 and Officer Vince Romano in the T.J. Hooker television series.

Early life
Zmed was born in Chicago, Illinois, the youngest of three sons of George Zmed, later known as George Zmed-Smith (1916–2010), a Romanian Orthodox priest, who served from 1952 until his retirement in 1983, and his wife, Persida (née Golub) Zmed, later known as Sadie Smith (1923–2015). His father George was a first-generation Romanian-American born in Chicago to Nicolae and Paraschiva (née Bălan), who had emigrated from Comloșu Mare, Timiș County in the early 20th century. At the age of five, George and his family returned to Romania, where he was educated, and returned to the United States in November 1952. George and Persida (also Romanian-born) were married October 15, 1942, in Timișoara. The couple had three sons, in the following order: Cornel, Walter, and Adrian.

Adrian graduated from Lane Tech High School in Chicago. He began playing football for the school's team until, when playing in 1968, he broke a leg bone which in turn punctured a major artery. He quit sports and began acting, appearing in his high school's production of Guys and Dolls. After being featured on a local TV show as one of Chicago's top high school performers, Zmed transferred to the Goodman School of Drama and began studying voice at the Chicago Conservatory of Music. He graduated with a Bachelor of Fine Arts from the Goodman School of Drama.

Acting career
Zmed's first major acting gig was the role of Danny Zuko in the national touring company production of Grease. He later appeared in the Broadway musical three times, twice in the role of Zuko. At 40, Zmed revived the role of Zuko in the 1995 Broadway revival.

Television
In 1978, Zmed made his television debut, appearing as Marty Decker in two episodes of Starsky & Hutch. From there, he won the role of Socks Palermo in the short-lived television series Flatbush (1979), based upon the film The Lords of Flatbush. Following the show's cancellation, he was cast as Frankie Millardo in Goodtime Girls, which lasted one season (1980). He had guest roles on such series as Angie, I'm a Big Girl Now and Bosom Buddies, and made a guest appearance on An Evening at the Improv in 1982.

Zmed reached celebrity status as Officer Romano in ABC's T.J. Hooker. He played Fred Feliciano in Victims for Victims: The Theresa Saldana Story (1984) and made guest appearances on a number of television shows throughout the 1980s and 1990s, including Hotel, Empty Nest, Murder, She Wrote and Caroline in the City. He left T.J. Hooker in 1985 when the show moved to CBS, choosing instead to replace Deney Terrio as host of Dance Fever for its final two seasons.

He has appeared as himself on VH1's I Love the 80s, Saturday Night Live and The Bozo Show. He appeared as Basil (the "floating head") on the soap opera Passions and participated in VH1's Confessions of a Teen Idol.

Features
Following the huge success of John Travolta and Olivia Newton-John in the movie version of Grease, Paramount Pictures quickly secured the rights to a sequel. Zmed was chosen to play one of the lead roles in Grease 2, Johnny Nogerelli, the new leader of the T-Birds gang. His performance led to other movie roles, including The Final Terror (1983) and Bachelor Party (1984). He appears in the film The Craving Heart (2006).

Return to theatre
Zmed returned to stage work in the 1990s. In 1992, he appeared Off-Broadway in the musical version of Eating Raoul. He headlined the musical Children of Eden at the Paper Mill Playhouse. He starred in three shows on Broadway: Falsettos, Blood Brothers, and Grease. He later appeared as Noah in the musical The Ark in New York City. He played Nick in the short-lived play Surf the Musical at Planet Hollywood in Las Vegas in 2012.

Other work
Zmed provided the voiceover for Toth in the 2002 video game Star Wars Jedi Starfighter. He was also under contract from June 2008 to April 2009 with Princess Cruise Lines to perform Adrian Zmed, in Concert... aboard the Coral Princess and the Island Princess.

In 2006, he filmed a 30-second public service announcement for the non-profit organization Dogs Deserve Better.

Personal life
Zmed has been married three times. He married his high school sweetheart, Barbara Fitzner, in 1976. Their two sons, Zachary and Dylan, are rock musicians who have been members of the rock band The Janks and the Bird Dogs, an Everly Brothers tribute band.

Zmed married Broadway actress/singer Susan Wood in 1995; that marriage also ended in divorce.

He married Lyssa Lynne Baker on October 5, 2012. They held another (smaller) wedding in Thailand on November 23, 2012.

Zmed remains friends with his co-star and childhood television hero William Shatner. He spoke in a 2016 interview with Las Vegas Magazine about Shatner:

Filmography

Film

Television

Video games

References

External links

Adrian Zmed at Internet Off-Broadway Database

1954 births
American male singers
American male film actors
American male musical theatre actors
American male television actors
American people of Romanian descent
Living people
Singers from Chicago
Male actors from Chicago
DePaul University alumni